Brian Michael Forde (born November 1, 1963) is a Canadian former American football linebacker. He played for the New Orleans Saints from 1988 to 1991, the BC Lions from 1994 to 1995 and for the Montreal Alouettes in 1996.

References

1963 births
Living people
American football linebackers
Amsterdam Admirals players
Anglophone Quebec people
Washington State Cougars football players
BC Lions players
Montreal Alouettes players
New Orleans Saints players
Canadian football people from Montreal
Canadian players of American football